Clear The Air is a voluntary organisation aiming at reducing air pollution in Hong Kong. It was founded on 10 December 1997 as a Society under the Societies Ordinance (Cap 151). It is self-sustained and is supported by individual membership fees and member donations.

爭氣 means "fighting for air" and "living up to others' expectations". 行動 means "Action".
So the Chinese name of Clear The Air means that people must "Act now – fight for better air" and also "Act now to meet others' expectations".

Mission
Clear The Air is a voluntary organisation and a registered Charity.  It hopes to raise the awareness of the Government and the legislative council on the worsening air quality in Hong Kong.

Objectives
 To form an association among members of the public having a common goal in protecting air quality from excessive pollution in Hong Kong;
 To take all lawful actions in educating the public on the need to protect air quality and the public health; and
 To take all lawful actions in persuading the Government of Hong Kong to take actions to protect air quality.

History
In June 1997, at a dinner party, Barbara Parr, Ruby Cautherly, Anne Forrest and Janet Golden agreed to set up this organisation.  They also agreed that each of them has to find a friend to set up and join this organisation.  They have found six people altogether, they are George Cautherly, Christine Loh and Michel Porro, Michael Moszynski, Pip Landers and Lisa Hopkinson. At last, these ten people joined hands to form Clear the Air.

Hong Kong Telecom (acquired by PCCW Limited in 2000) donated HK$50,000 as the initial funding to "Clear the Air".  Barbara Parr then arranged for pro bono council.Ruby Cautherly's graphic design company designed the corporate logo, pro bono, and donated all graphic materials. Anne Forrest loaned her centrally located Conference Room for the meetings.  Michel Porro did all of the photography pro bono and George Cautherly was a part-time administrator.  Moreover, Michael Moszynski of M&C Saatchi, now LONDON Advertising, was one of the earliest members and he did the advertising work on a pro bono basis. Ms Christine Loh became Undersecretary of the Environment from 2012 - 2017. Our former Patron Professor Dr Anthony Hedley passed away in 2014. Our current patron is Dr Judith Mackay.

Ten years later in 2007 the Executive Committee comprised
Chairman Christian Masset
Vice-Chairman : Phil Heung
Secretary : Amy Ng
Communications : Phil Smyth
Membership : Ann Davy Hou
Tobacco / Legal : James Middleton
Energy :  Mark Hunter
Idling Engines : Amy Ng
Marine & Aviation :  Guy Shirra
Town Planning : Dr AuYeung Chi Shing
Indoor : George Woo
The current Chairman is James Middleton
The current Past Chair is Christian Masset
The current Hon Secretary is Andrew Mak
http://cleartheair.org.hk

Areas concerned
Hong Kong's poor air quality is the main topic of conversation in town.  Many people want to understand the details so they can assess to matters and take actions, such as deciding whether to stay in or leave Hong Kong.

The five main areas about which the organisation is most concerned are "Pollutants from China", "Vehicles and Vessels", "Traffic and Roads", "Power Plants" and "Tobacco Smoke".

Central District and Victoria Harbour on a polluted morning and a clear morning as shown on the right hand side, taken from a rooftop on Seymour Rd (near Robinson Rd).

Pollutants from China
Clear the Air is concerned at the condition of air quality in the Pearl River Delta and how it affects the air quality in Hong Kong. The air pollution from Shenzhen and the province of Guangdong mostly affects Hong Kong in winter time when the prevailing winds are from the North.

The organisation has claimed the "Blue Sky" project launched by the Guangdong Government in 2000, which is a project to curb the air pollution problem, as a mystery. In the project 100 cases of industrial pollution were to be dealt with, but the organisation questions which companies are involved and how many of them are Hong Kong companies aka Cartels.

Vehicles and vessels
Clear the Air has stated that diesel engines are one of the main sources of roadside pollutants, they support the use of hybrid buses, and urges Government to turn all public light buses into Liquid Petroleum Gas (LPG) vehicles.
Other areas concerned are smoky vehicles and vessels (e.g.ships, boats and ferries, where reporting of idling engines is also encouraged by the organisation.

The organisation recommends anyone to report any vessel that emits black smoke continuously to the Marine Department.

It also recommends citizens to travel by mass transit systems like the Mass Transit Railway (MTR), which save energy and creates much less air pollution.

Traffic and roads
The organisation is in the position against building new roads and they believe that this would not neither reduce the traffic nor the number of cars. They are in favour of imposing a congestion charge. In 2005, when the Transport Department has stated that the traffic congestion on Northern Hong Kong Island should be solved by building a new bypass, Clear the Air maintained that a new bypass would not be the solution, where an Electronic Road Pricing (ERP) is the only solution to the congestion problem.

Power plants
The organisation is concerned about the pollution generated by the two electric companies Hong Kong Electric Holdings Ltd. and CLP Holdings Ltd. and claims that a tighter emission level should be applied. The three power plants in Hong Kong burn coal. Exxon Mobil is the major shareholder in the CLP venture and mega tycoon Li Ka Shing owns HK Electric.  The companies sell a percentage of their output power over the border to Guangdong.

According to the data recorded by The Environmental Protection Department in 2004, the three power plants account for the emission of the major pollutants in Hong Kong. The emission and accumulation of respirable suspended particulates are the major pollution threats in Hong Kong. High concentration of pollutants leads to the formation of smog and haze and triggers health hazards, especially respiratory illnesses like asthma.

Their chairman has once described "Hongkong Electric as a heavy polluter" and demanded the company to achieve the 2010 emission reduction targets where otherwise action should be taken against it.

The organisation advocates the use of renewable energy which is clean and pollution-free, for example, wind power and solar power whilst lowering existing electricity usage.

As a result of the 2007 UNEP Governing Council Meeting 140 governments have agreed that work should start as soon as possible to aim for a global binding agreement on mercury. The reduction of toxic mercury should be achieved through several means that are stated in a proposal made by several environmental NGOS that attended the 2007 UNEP meeting.

Tobacco smoke
The organisation is firmly against smoking as tobacco smoke contributes to vast amount of pollutant like nicotine, respirable suspended particles and carbon monoxide.
Clear the Air has stated that they will help to check smoking by several means.
 To help enforce the smoking ban, by giving their members instructions for reporting to the Labour Department about cases where the ban is not enforced.
 To get more bars and restaurants to become smoke-free without Qualified Establishment Exemptions. But the Hong Kong Administration, after taking years to bring in the anti-smoking legislation, immediately granted smoking deferral exemptions to any licensed restaurant or bar that applied for same – the exemptions remain valid until 1 July 2009. The ironic fact is that the Health Department is the authority granting the smoking law exemptions whilst having to treat the results.
 To try stopping smoking advertisements that the organisation believes as hooking people to smoke since young age, by challenging with the Hong Kong Trademark Department on trademarks of tobacco company.
 To try banning smoking in public places, by using the interpretation of the littering law, which states that the action of "blow" "offensive, noxious or obnoxious matter " or "any substance likely to constitute a nuisance" is not allowed.

Hong Kong as a Special Administrative Region of China must abide by the Framework Convention on Tobacco Control treaty to which China is a ratified signatory.
On World No Tobacco Day 2011 Clear the Air was presented with a plaque by the Minister of Health York CHOW for its work in tobacco control in Hong Kong.

Actions and activities
The organisation acts actively to raise the awareness of curbing air pollution in Hong Kong, this includes giving demonstrations and press releases and having interaction with the public directly.

Engine Street Patrol discontinued
The offence of allowing an engine to idle has now been gazetted and the HK Government is to be responsible for enforcing this law.

Presentations
The organisation expresses their view in issues concerning air quality by presenting them to the Government. Clear the Air also reports to international organisations about the condition of air pollution in Hong Kong.

List of presentations by Clear the Air:
 March 2005 International Business Committee meeting with Government
 August 2005 Town Planning Board (about Electronic Road Pricing)
 September 2005 Harbourfront Enhancement Committee Expert Forum (about Electronic Road Pricing)
 September 2005 European Chambers of Commerce (about Pollution in the Pearl River Delta and Hong Kong)
 Numerous other presentations to schools in Hong Kong and attendance at International Tobacco control conferences

Publicity events
Clear the Air has organised many events in publicising the importance of good air quality.

List of events organised by Clear the Air:
 March 2000 Set up an Information booth during the spring Extravaganzafair.
 June 2000 Organised the KCRC/CLEAR THE AIR Clean Transport Poster Contest, aiming at primary and secondary school students.
 April 2005 Organised the "Earth Day" at Kowloon Park.

Liquor Licensing Board objections
Clear the Air does not oppose liquor licence renewals. Rather CTA moves to educate the licensees of their legal requirements to keep the workplace safe from dangers to the health of bar premises workers and patrons alike.

Measures to curb air pollution by Hong Kong SAR
Action Blue Sky
 to reduce emissions from vehicles;
 to reduce emissions from industrial sources and power plants.
Press Release

See also
 Clean Air Network

References

External links
 Clear The Air – official website

Air pollution organizations
Environmental organisations based in Hong Kong